Stephen Louis DiNatale is an American politician, who is the current Mayor of Fitchburg, Massachusetts.

Career
Raised in Leominster and of Italian descent, DiNatale graduated from St. Bernard's High School in Fitchburg in 1970. After high school, he joined the United States Navy as an operations specialist petty officer 3rd class until 1974. In 1979, he received his Bachelor of Science in Sociology from Fitchburg State College.

In 2000, DiNatale joined the Fitchburg Public Schools School Committee until 2003. From 2004 to 2006, he became a city councilor.

DiNatale served in the Massachusetts House of Representatives for the 3rd Worcester District from 2007 to 2016, succeeding Emile J. Goguen.

On November 3, 2015, DiNatale won the election for Mayor of Fitchburg with a large percentage of the vote, and assumed office in January 2016.

Personal life
A resident of Fitchburg, DiNatale is married to Joanne, with whom he has two children: Marcus and Alexandra.

References

External links
Ballotpedia bio

Year of birth missing (living people)
Living people
United States Navy non-commissioned officers
Politicians from Fitchburg, Massachusetts
American people of Italian descent
Fitchburg State University alumni
Democratic Party members of the Massachusetts House of Representatives
Mayors of places in Massachusetts